The Battery Place station was a station on the demolished Ninth Avenue and Sixth Avenue elevated train lines in Manhattan, New York City. It was located at the southern terminus of Greenwich Street at the north end of Battery Park.

The station had two tracks and two side platforms. It was served by trains from the IRT Sixth Avenue Line and IRT Ninth Avenue Line. It opened June 5, 1883. One block north of the station, the Sixth Avenue El diverged to the east at Morris Street. It closed on June 11, 1940, though Sixth Avenue line trains stopped serving it when that el line was closed in 1938.

The next southbound stop was South Ferry. The next northbound stops were Rector Street for Ninth Avenue Line trains (which replaced the earlier Morris Street station), Rector Street for local Sixth Avenue Line trains, and Park Place for Sixth Avenue Line express trains.

References

External links
Battery Place station seen in a colorized film from 1916

IRT Ninth Avenue Line stations
IRT Sixth Avenue Line stations
Railway stations closed in 1940
Former elevated and subway stations in Manhattan
1940 disestablishments in New York (state)